Nicholas Stephen Alkemade (10 December 1922 – 22 June 1987) was a British tail gunner in the Royal Air Force during World War II who survived a freefall of  without a parachute after abandoning his out-of-control, burning Avro Lancaster heavy bomber over Germany.

War service 
On the night of 24 March 1944, 21-year-old Alkemade was one of seven crew members in Avro Lancaster B Mk. II, DS664, of No. 115 Squadron RAF. Because his parachute had caught fire and was unserviceable, Alkemade jumped from the aircraft without it, preferring to die on impact rather than burn to death. He fell  to the ground below.

His fall was broken by pine trees and a soft snow cover on the ground. He was able to move his arms and legs and suffered only a sprained leg. The Lancaster crashed bursting into flames, killing pilot Jack Newman and three other members of the crew. They are buried in the Hanover War Cemetery.

Alkemade was subsequently captured and interviewed by the Gestapo, who were initially suspicious of his claim to have fallen without a parachute. This was until the wreckage of the aircraft was examined and his parachute was found as Alkemade had described it. The Germans gave Alkemade a certificate testifying to the fact. He was a celebrated prisoner of war, before being repatriated in May 1945.

Later life 
Alkemade worked in the chemical industry after the war. He appeared on the ITV series Just Amazing!, a programme where former motorcycle racer Barry Sheene interviewed people who had, through accident or design, achieved feats of daring and survival.

Alkemade died on 22 June 1987 in Liskeard, Cornwall aged 64. 

In January 2020, 115 Squadron at RAF Wittering voted to rename a building as "The Alkemade Building" in honour of his achievements in the RAF during World War 2.

See also 

 Fall survivors
 Ivan Chisov, Soviet airforce lieutenant who survived falling from his aircraft in 1942
 Juliane Koepcke, German teenager who survived a  fall after her flight broke up over the Peruvian Amazon in 1971
 Alan Magee, American airman who survived a  fall from his damaged B-17 in 1943
 Vesna Vulović, Serbian flight attendant who survived the  mid-air breakup of her aircraft in 1972
 Other
 Freefall
 List of sole survivors of aviation accidents or incidents

References

External links 
 Parachute History Website
 Air Scene UK - An Airman's war
 Video clip of Alkemade recounting the event

1922 births
1987 deaths
English people of Dutch descent
Fall survivors
Royal Air Force airmen
Royal Air Force personnel of World War II
Survivors of aviation accidents or incidents
World War II prisoners of war held by Germany
British World War II prisoners of war